Lucas Fernández may refer to:

 Lucas Fernández (footballer, born 1988), Argentine defender
 Lucas Fernández (footballer, born 1999), Argentine forward
 Lucas Fernández (musician) (born 1474), Spanish dramatist and musician